Florian Rus (born April 19, 1989) is a Romanian singer and songwriter. He wrote songs for artists such as AMI, Mira, Andra, Delia, Loredana, Andreea Bălan, Alina Eremia, Lidia Buble and Corina.

Life and career
Florian Rus was born on April 19, 1989, in the city of Târgoviște. The artist is the son of the Romanian folk musician Mircea Rusu.

Florian Rus's debut single was released in early 2014, titled "Cum arată dragostea", and is a collaboration with Alexandra Ungureanu. In the autumn of the same year, he participated in the fourth season of the show Vocea României, broadcast by PRO TV. He was not among the finalists of the show but was noticed by Marius Moga and co-opted to DeMoga Studios as a producer.

On July 1, 2019, Florian Rus together with Mira released the single "Străzile din București". The song climbed to number 1 on the Top Airplay 100 after 54 days of release, where it remained for another 14 weeks. In December 2019, the artist released his first EP, Străzile din București, which contains four tracks.

As a composer and lyricist, Florian Rus' repertoire includes songs such as "Ce zodie ești" (2016) performed by Delia and Marius Moga, "Enigma" (2021) performed by AMI and Tata Vlad or "Dependența mea" (2021) performed by Alina Eremia.

In 2022, the song "Străzile din București" was included on the soundtrack of the television series Ruxx, produced and broadcast by HBO Max. On June 24, 2022, Florian Rus released "Dulce greșeală", the first single from his EP Flacăra mea geamănă, which was released on August 5.

Discography

Albums

Extended plays

Singles

As lead artist

As featured artist

Songwriting credits

Filmography

Television

References

External links

 
 

1989 births
People from Târgoviște
21st-century Romanian singers
Global Records artists
English-language singers from Romania
Living people
21st-century Romanian male singers